Lamia Eddinari (born July 19, 1999) is a Moroccan judoka. Her last victory was in the African Junior Championships 2019 where she won a gold medal in the women's half lightweight 52 kg.

Achievement
Eddinari won a bronze medal at the African Games in Rabat in 2019. She also won a bronze medal at the African Open in Dakar in 2021.

References

External links 
 

Living people
1999 births
21st-century Moroccan women
African Games medalists in judo
African Games bronze medalists for Morocco
Competitors at the 2019 African Games
Moroccan female judoka